Arsissa ramosella is a species of snout moth in the genus Arsissa. It was described by Gottlieb August Wilhelm Herrich-Schäffer in 1852. It is found in Turkey and Transcaucasia.

References

Moths described in 1852
Phycitini
Moths of Asia